KMEC-LP is a Variety formatted broadcast radio station licensed to and serving Ukiah, California.  KMEC-LP is owned and operated by Mendocino Environmental Center.

References

External links
 KMEC 105.1 Online
 

2005 establishments in California
Variety radio stations in the United States
Radio stations established in 2005
MEC-LP
MEC-LP